Yogesh Sachdeva (born 31 July 1982) is an Indian former cricketer. He played three first-class matches for Delhi between 2005 and 2006.

See also
 List of Delhi cricketers

References

External links
 

1982 births
Living people
Indian cricketers
Delhi cricketers
Cricketers from Delhi